In Advaita Vedanta and Jnana Yoga Nididhyasana (Sanskrit: निदिध्यासन) is profound and repeated meditation on the mahavakyas, great Upanishadic statements such as "That art Thou", to realize the identity of Atman and Brahman. It is the fourth step in the training of a sisya (disciple), consisting of preparatory practices, listening to the teachings as contained in the sruti, reflection on the teachings, and nididhyasana.

Four stages of practice
Nididhyasana is the final step in the correct understanding of the meaning of the Mahavakyas. Classical Advaita Vedanta emphasises the path of Jnana Yoga, a progression of study and training to attain moksha. It consists of four stages:
 Samanyasa or Sampattis, the "fourfold discipline" (sādhana-chatustaya), cultivating the following four qualities:
  (नित्यानित्य वस्तु विवेकम्) — The ability (viveka) to correctly discriminate between the eternal (nitya) substance (Brahman) and the substance that is transitory existence (anitya).
  (इहाऽमुत्रार्थ फल भोगविरागम्) — The renunciation (virāga) of enjoyments of objects (artha phala bhoga) in this world (iha) and the other worlds (amutra) like heaven etc.
  (शमादि षट्क सम्पत्ति) — the sixfold qualities,
 Śama (control of the ).
 Dama (the control of external sense organs).
 Uparati (the cessation of these external organs so restrained, from the pursuit of objects other than that, or it may mean the abandonment of the prescribed works according to scriptural injunctions).
 Titikṣa (the tolerating of ).
 Śraddhā (the faith in Guru and Vedas).
Samādhāna (the concentrating of the mind on God and Guru).
  (मुमुक्षुत्वम्) — The firm conviction that the nature of the world is misery and the intense longing for moksha (release from the cycle of births and deaths).
 Sravana, listening to the teachings of the sages on the Upanishads and Advaita Vedanta, and studying the Vedantic texts, such as the Brahma Sutras. In this stage the student learns about the reality of Brahman and the identity of atman;
 Manana (reflection), the stage of reflection on the teachings;
 Nididhyāsana, the stage of meditation on the truth "that art Thou".

Nididhyasana is a rational and cognitive process, which differs from dhyana (meditation). It is necessary for gaining Brahmajnana:

Nididhyasana done independently of sravana does not lead to the realization of the Atman.

Explanation

Advaita Vedanta
Brihadaranyaka Upanishad (II.iv.5) defines Nididhyasana as the meditation for the sake of direct vision. Yajnavalkya tells his wife –

आत्मा वा अरे द्रष्टव्यः श्रोतव्यो मन्तव्यो निदिध्यासितव्यो मैत्रेयि, 
आत्मनो व अरे दर्शनेन श्रवणेन मत्या विज्ञानेनेदं सर्वं विदितम् ||

"The Self, my dear Maitreyi, should be realized – should be heard of, reflected on and meditated upon; 
by the realization of the Self, my dear, through hearing, reflection and meditation, all this is known." -  (Brihadaranyaka Upanishad St.II.iv.5)

Sankara explains Nididhyasana as meditation with determination. Sankara states:-

श्रुतेः शतगुणं विद्यान्मननं मननादपि |
निदिध्यासं लक्षगुणम् अनन्तं निर्विकल्पकम् ||

"Reflection (manana) is hundred times superior to listening (sravana); 
meditation (nididhyasana) is hundred times superior to reflection; nirvikalpaka samadhi is infinitely superior."

According to Suresvara, Nididhyasana is the culmination of the practice of sravana and manana, which is an indirect intuition of Brahman and does not mean meditation but knowledge (vijnana) i.e. understanding the meaning of the Sruti on the basis of vacya-vacaka relation underlying the mahavakya. Suresvara states:-

शास्त्रचार्यानुभवनैर्हेतुभिश्च समर्थितः|
ईदृगैकात्म्यसंबोधो निदिध्यासनमुच्यते ||

"Nididhyasana is so called when, instruction about the uniqueness of the Atman is justified 
by (proper) reasons viz. the Sruti, (the instructions of) teachers and (one’s own) experience (of the same)."

Nididhyasana consists in acquisition of vakyarthajnana and this verse explains the purport of sunisnata.

According to Vacaspati, sravana, manana and nidihyasana are a chain of causes contributory to the knowledge of the oneness of Brahman. The Vivarna school considers sravana as the principal cause but Suresvara treats sravana and manana to be co-existent, these two culminate into nididhyasana.

Dvaita Vedanta
According to Madhva the knowledge acquired by study ('śravaṇa') and stabilized by reflection ('manana') is made the basis of steady contemplation ('nididhyasana'); these are the three stages of inquiry that take the form of Dhyana. Radhakrishnan has defined Nididhyasana as "the process by which intellectual conscience is transformed into a vital one there is stillness, a calm in which the soul lays itself open to the Divine".

Neo-Vedanta
According to Michael James, who gives an Advaita Vedanta interpretation of Ramana Maharshi, Ramana's self-enquiry is the same as Nididhyasana and atma-vichara.

See also
 Lectio Divina

Notes

References

Sources

Printed sources

Web-Sources

Hindu philosophical concepts
Meditation
Vedanta
Sanskrit words and phrases